The Western Azores goldcrest (Regulus regulus inermis), Estrelinha-de-poupa in Portuguese, is a very small passerine bird in the kinglet family.  It is endemic to the Azores archipelago, in the North Atlantic Ocean, where it is a non-migratory resident of the islands of Flores, Faial, Terceira, São Jorge and Pico.

References

western Azores goldcrest
Birds of the Azores
western Azores goldcrest
western Azores goldcrest